The 2021–22 season was Dumbarton Football Club's fourth in Scottish League One, the third tier of Scottish football, having finished ninth in the division in 2020–21 and winning the playoffs. Dumbarton also competed in the Scottish League Cup, Scottish Challenge Cup and the Scottish Cup.

Story of the season

May 

After ensuring the Sons avoided relegation via the playoffs, manager Jim Duffy departed the club by mutual consent on May 24 after two-and-a-half years in charge. Ross Forbes was next to depart, joining League Two side Stenhousemuir on May 26 and he was followed by Nat Wedderburn who also joined the Warriors. Defender Ryan McGeever however became the first player to commit his future to the club, signing a new two-year deal on May 27. A day later forward PJ Crossan became the third player to depart the club, signing a two-year deal with League Two Forfar Athletic. The same day the Sons were drawn with St Mirren, Dunfermline Athletic, Partick Thistle and Stenhousemuir in the Scottish League Cup. On May 29 Stephen Farrell was announced as the club's new manager, signing a two-year deal. Frank McKeown followed him as the club's new assistant manager with Barry Smith leaving the Sons. The following day goalkeeper coach Robert Glen departed with Eric Phillips, who had worked with Farrell at Stranraer, joining the Sons in his place. The month ended with Morgyn Neill and Rico Quitongo turning down new deals at the club whilst Ruaridh Langan, Joshua Bradley-Hurst, Daniel Church and Robert Jones were all released.

June 
On June 2, Andy Geggan became the club's first new signing of the summer. Inking a one-year deal a decade after leaving the club. The same day defender Sam Wardrop rejected a new deal and left the club. Conner Duthie became the second member of the 2020–21 squad to extend his deal on June 3. Inking a new season long contract. He was joined in signing up for the new season by Paddy Boyle who re-joined the club - 12 years after leaving. Midfielder Eoghan Stokes was the next player to sign and he was followed in arriving by goalkeeper Callum Erskine - signed from Stenhousemuir. The same day club captain Stuart Carswell signed a new two-year deal keeping him at the Rock until the summer of 2023. Winger Adam Frizzell rejected a deal however, becoming the third Sons player to move to Airdrieonians and he was joined in turning down a new deal by Jaime Wilson - who left to pursue a trial at a full-time club. June 10 saw five new faces arrive, in the shape of returning midfielder Joe McKee, winger Ross MacLean,  striker David Hopkirk, defensive midfielder Paul Paton and defender Edin Lynch. Gregor Buchanan was the next player to sign, returning to the club he had left in 2017 on a two-year deal. Goalkeeper Sam Ramsbottom extended his time at the Rock for another season the same day, having made himself first choice after arriving in March 2021. Attacker Kalvin Orsi completed a trio of signings - as the Sons returned to pre-season training. The league fixtures were announced on June 15 - with Sons starting away to Clyde on July 31. Dumbarton's pre-season campaign kicked off on June 22, as the Sons lost 2-1 to Lowland Football League East Kilbride. Kalvin Orsi got Dumbarton's goal. That was followed by a 1-0 victory against Scottish Premiership Motherwell, courtesy of a late David Hopkirk strike and 0-0 draw with Greenock Morton.

July 
The Sons' final pre-season friendly ended in a 1-0 victory against local rivals Clydebank thanks to Joe McKee's goal. The same day Carlo Pignatiello became the club's latest new recruit - joining on a season long loan from Livingston. He was followed in arriving by Norwegian forward Kristoffer Syvertsen and former Hibernian midfielder Callum Wilson. A positive Covid-19 test saw the Sons' first Scottish League Cup tie with St Mirren forfeited on July 10. On July 12 defender Sam Muir became the club's 15th new signing of the summer. Joining from Motherwell. He was followed by 16-year-old Kirk McKnight who joined on a loan deal from Kilmarnock. Able to name just two outfield substitutes, the Sons lost 2-1 to Scottish League Two Stenhousemuir in their first League Cup tie - with Ross MacLean on the scoresheet. Midfielder Evan Maley joined the club on amateur terms on July 16 - with four players still self-isolating. The following day Sons lost 5-1 to Dunfermline Athletic with Maclean again on the scoresheet. On Monday July 19 midfielder Mark Lamont became the club's latest new addition. Joining after two years out of football. The League Cup campaign ended with a 2-0 loss to Championship side Partick Thistle on July 20. On July 31 Sons started their league campaign with a 3-0 victory against Clyde at Broadwood Stadium. A Conrad Balatoni own goal was added to by strikes from Ross MacLean and Conner Duthie.

August 
A 2-2 draw with Airdrieonians followed, with Ryan McGeever and Andy Geggan scoring in the final 10 minutes after Sons had been two goals down. Striker Ryan Schiavone became the club's 19th new signing of the summer on August 10, joining on a six-month loan from Heart of Midlothian. He made his debut in a 3-2 Scottish Challenge Cup defeat to Rangers B to following day. Back-to-back defeats to Queen's Park and Cove Rangers then followed. August ended with a 2-1 away victory against Montrose where Kalvin Orsi scored his first goal for the club.

September 
September began with goalkeeper Patrick O'Neil joining the club following an injury to Callum Erskine. The Sons first game of the month saw them defeat East Fife 5-0 - their biggest league victory in over a decade - with Ross MacLean, Gregor Buchanan, Ryan McGeever and Eoghan Stokes all on the scoresheet. That was followed by a 2-1 away victory against Falkirk with Kalvin Orsi and Callum Wilson on target, and a 1-1 draw with Alloa Athletic where Paddy Boyle scored his first goal of the season at the newly renamed Moreroom.com Stadium.

October 
October began in disastrous fashion with a 5-0 away defeat to Peterhead. On October 7 manager Stephen Farrell and midfielder Callum Wilson were both recognised for their performances in September by being named Scottish Professional Football League monthly award winners. This was followed by a 3-0 defeat to Queen's Park and incredible 3-2 defeat to Airdrieonians - where the Sons finished with eight men. On October 26 striker David Hopkirk announced he would take a break from football, but would remain under contract with the Sons. The following day chairman John Steele stepped down, and was replaced by Dr Neil Mackay in the role. October ended with another defeat - this time 2-1 to East Fife, with Conner Duthie on the scoresheet.

November 
The losing run was ended on November 6 with a 1-1 draw against Clyde. Eoghan Stokes' third goal of the season gave Dumbarton the lead in the 89th minute, only for David Goodwillie to level in injury time. That was followed by a 3-0 defeat to Falkirk on November 13 that extended the winless run to seven games. A first win since September finally arrived on November 21, with the Sons defeating Alloa Athletic 2-1 courtesy of Stuart Carswell's penalty and Eoghan Stokes' late strike. Fernandy Mendy was sent off for the hosts. Goals from Carlo Pignatiello, Joe McKee and Ryan Schiavone saw the Sons then defeat East of Scotland Football League Sauchie Juniors in the third round of the Scottish Cup and they were drawn against Dundee at home in the fourth round.

December 
December opened with a 2-0 defeat to table topping Cove Rangers and 3-1 home loss to Montrose. The Sons then twice led against Peterhead through Andy Geggan and Conner Duthie before suffering their third consecutive loss, 3-2. The Boxing Day clash with Queen's Park was then called off due to a Covid-19 outbreak.

January 
The Sons' first game of 2022 ended with a fourth straight loss, 1-0 at home to Airdrieonians. A day later defender Kirk McKnight returned to Kilmarnock at the end of his loan spell. Goalkeeper Calum Erskine was next to leave, as he was released on January 6. A heavy 6-2 loss to Falkirk followed, with Gregg Wylde featuring as a trialist. Wylde signed permanently for the club on January 10, whilst forward Ryan Schiavone returned to Heart of Midlothian at the end of his loan deal. Kieran Wright was next to arrive, with the goalkeeper joining on loan from Rangers on January 13. He was followed by forward Joshua Oyinsan who joined from National League North Eastbourne Borough. Oyinsan scored on his debut, with Gregg Wylde adding a second as Sons secured their first victory of the year against East Fife on January 15. Adam Hutchinson was the next new face, joining on loan from Dundee United on January 21. The Sons exited the Scottish Cup 1-0 against Premiership Dundee on January 22, in a game where they were reduced to 10 men in the first half following the dismissal of Ross MacLean. The same day defender Stephen Bronsky - who had featured as a trialist in the victory against East Fife - joined the club. MacLean's red card was later overturned on appeal. On January 28 midfielders Andy Geggan and Evan Maley left the club. January ended with a 2-2 draw against league leaders Cove Rangers, with Stuart Carswell scoring twice from the penalty spot. Off the park Colin Piechniczek joined the club's board.

February 
The Sons' first game of February ended in a 1-1 draw away to Montrose, with Josh Oyinsan on target. A 2-1 defeat to Queen's Park followed, with Stuart Carswell scoring his sixth of the campaign to become the club's top scorer for the season. On February 11, goalkeeper Patrick O'Neil joined West of Scotland Football League side Troon on loan until the end of the season. On February 12 the Sons defeated Clyde 3-1 at Broadwood Stadium with Ross MacLean scoring a brace, and Stuart Carswell also on target. All three goals came within the first 21 minutes. On February 18, defender George Stanger joined on loan from Lowland Football League University of Stirling. He made his debut in a 2-1 defeat to Alloa Athletic with Paul Paton scoring. Paton was sent-off the following week, along with Ross MacLean, taking the Sons' total of red cards in league games to five - all dished out by referee Scott Lambie. Goals from MacLean, Eoghan Stokes and Carlo Pignatiello weren't enough to stop the nine man Sons losing 4-3 to Peterhead however, as they dropped to ninth in the League One table.

March 
The Sons' first game in March ended in a 3-0 defeat to Queen's Park - their fourth defeat in four games to the Spiders. That was followed by damaging defeats to East Fife (where captain Stuart Carswell picked up the first red card of his Dumbarton career) and Falkirk - with the Sons falling behind inside the first five minutes of four consecutive games. It was also the second time during the season where the side had lost five straight league matches. The month ended with a 0-0 draw against Montrose, with Kieran Wright saving a late Michael Gardyne penalty to earn his first clean sheet of the season. In the game striker Kristoffer Syvertsen made his first appearance since August 11 after a lengthy injury battle.

April 
The club's first game of April saw Syvertsen grab the winner against Alloa Athletic in the fifth minute of injury time, with Conner Duthie scoring the first brace of his Dumbarton career on his 50th appearance. That was followed by a 1-1 draw with Peterhead with Joshua Oyinsan on target. A late defeat to 10 man Airdrieonians on April 16 however saw the Sons' place in the relegation playoffs confirmed for a second consecutive season. That was followed by a 1-0 defeat against Cove Rangers that saw the Aberdeen side win the 2021–22 Scottish League One title. The regular season ended with a 2-1 victory against Clyde - with Syvertsen and Gregg Wylde on target. Following the game Conner Duthie was named the club's Player of the Year, with Carlo Pignatiello named Players' Player of the Year and Young Player of the Year.

May 
In May the Sons were relegated to Scottish League Two for the first time since 2009, after a 5-2 aggregate defeat to Edinburgh City. Ross MacLean was on target in the first leg, taking him to nine for the season, with Kristoffer Syvertsen's third of the campaign the only goal the Sons managed in the home leg.

First team transfers 
From end of 2020–21 season, to last match of season 2021–22

In

Out

Fixtures and results

Friendlies

Scottish League One

Scottish League One Playoffs

Scottish Cup

Scottish League Cup

Matches

Scottish Challenge Cup

Player statistics

All competitions

Captains

League table

References 

Dumbarton
Dumbarton